Maurice or Morris Flynn may refer to:

 Maurice Flynn (presenter) (born 1976), BBC journalist and presenter
 Maurice Bennett Flynn (1892–1959), American college football player and actor
 Maurice Flynn (hurler) (1865–1936), Irish hurler
 Morris Flynn, character in The Man Who Was Sherlock Holmes